Mr. Squiggle (originally also known as Mr. Squiggle and Friends) is an Australian children's television series, and the name of the title character from that ABC show. The show was presented on television in many formats, between its inception on 1 July 1959 and 1999, from five-minute slots to a one-and-a-half-hour variety show featuring other performers, and has had several name changes, originally airing as Mr. Squiggle and Friends. At its height, the program was one of the most popular children's programs in Australia and toured theatre and conventions, entertaining several generations who grew with the program. It became one of the longest-running children's programs on Australian television.

History
Mr. Squiggle, the central character was created by cartoonist and puppeteer Norman Hetherington, and the character first appeared on the Children's TV Club on ABC TV, but was spun off into his own programme which first aired on 1 July 1959. Hetherington voiced and operated all of the show's puppets, while his wife Margaret wrote the scripts.

The basic premise of the show remained the same: children wrote in with their "squiggles" and Mr. Squiggle would turn them into recognisable drawings by connecting lines with his pencil nose. More often than not, the picture would be drawn upside down (Hetherington manipulated the puppet from above by viewing the drawing upside down), and then Mr. Squiggle would gleefully declare, "Upside down! Upside down!"—asking his assistant to turn the picture the right way up and reveal the completed drawing.

The last episode went to air just over 40 years after the first, on 9 July 1999. The last episode was produced in 1997; however, it was not until 2001 that the contract with the ABC concluded. After the show ceased production, the entire cast of puppets from Mister Squiggle and Friends were owned by the show's creator, Norman Hetherington. They have been loaned for display at exhibitions, such as at the National Film and Sound Archive and as part of the "50 Years of TV" exhibition at the Australian Centre for the Moving Image in 2007. Hetherington and his puppets appeared on the ABC TV series Collectors in 2010.

Characters
Mr. Squiggle

Mr. Squiggle, the central character is a marionette with a pencil for a nose, who visits his friends from his home at 93 Crater Crescent on the Moon, flying to Earth in his pet rocket (named Rocket). In every episode he would create several pictures from "squiggles" sent in by children from around the country. Mr. Squiggle is a cheery, gentle and good-natured yet scatter-brained character who is often distracted and occasionally goes for "space-walks", leading his assistant to calm him down and get him to focus on the task of drawing.

Other characters

Other puppet characters that appeared in the show included:
 Blackboard, the grumpy blackboard that Mr. Squiggle uses for an easel, whose catchphrases are "Hurry up", "Hmmph", "Double hmmph" and "Booorrriing".
 Gus the Snail, who had a TV for a shell and later, a flower pot, often tells knock-knock jokes.
 Bill the Steam Shovel, who likes to tell corny jokes (often in the form of riddles) and belch steam (talcum powder) out of his "nose" when he laughs.

Assistants

Mr. Squiggle was helped by a human assistant in all of the show's incarnations; they included Miss Gina (Gina Curtis), Miss Pat (Pat Lovell), Miss Jane (Jane Fennell), and later series featured Roxanne (Roxanne Kimmorley) and Rebecca (Rebecca Hetherington, Hetherington's daughter). In his first incarnation as Mr. Jolly Squiggle on the Children's TV Club his assistant was Miss Faith (Faith Linton).

Guest cast

Comedians Mikey Robins and Merrick Watts played one of the show's characters, Reg Linchpin, for a year from 1989 to 1990. Other notable guest performers on the show included actor Paul Chubb and magician Timothy Hyde.

Commemorated
In February 2019 the Royal Australian Mint released a series of two dollar coins to mark the 60th anniversary of the first broadcast of the programme. The coins feature images of Squiggle himself, Gus the Snail, Bill the Steam Shovel, and Blackboard.

See also

 Norman Hetherington
 List of longest-running Australian television series

Footnotes

References 

 ABC TV programme: Australian Story: 30 October 1996: "Mr. Squiggle".
 ABC TV programme: The Collectors: 2010: Episode 21: (Friday 30 July 2010): "Mr. Squiggle".
 Anon, "Wonderbox", The Australian Women's Weekly, (Wednesday, 28 October 1964), p.17.
 Anon, "Prime Minister gets Squiggled", The Herald Sun, Thursday, 28 May 2009.
 Anon, "Man behind Mr Squiggle dies", ABC News, Tuesday, 7 December 2010.
 Bradshaw, R.,"Norman Hetherington 1921 – 2010 (Eulogy)", O.P.E.N., No.11, (December 2010), pp.2–4.
 Design and Art Australia Online Biography: Norman Hetherington.
 Foyle, L., "Creative Mind Thrilled Children", The Sydney Morning Herald, Wednesday, 8 December 2010.
 Guss, Naomi, "Australian puppetry – Mr. Squiggle", School of Puppetry, Monday, 6 December 2010).
 Johnson, C., "Award-winning Stuff from Mr. Squiggle", The Sydney Morning Herald, (Monday, 11 June 1990), p.3.
 McDonald, T., "Mr Squiggle's creator dies", A.M. (ABC Local Radio), Tuesday, 7 December 2010.
 Miller, A., "Squiggle: an ABC survivor", The Age: Green Guide, (Thursday, 5 July 1979), p.7.
 Miner, J., "Mr. Squiggle is still drawing the children", The Sydney Morning Herald, (Wednesday, 11 July 1984), p.17.
 Morris, J., "Squiggle's friends make a fine team", The Age: Green Guide, (Thursday, 5 April 1984), p.4.
 Mosman Art Gallery: Tribute to Norman Hetherington, 10 December 2010.
 Musgrove, N., "Many Happy Returns to Mr. Squiggle", The Australian Women's Weekly, (Wednesday, 24 July 1974), p.57.
 O.P.E.N., Theme Issue: Norman Hetherington OAM, O.P.E.N. (Oz Puppetry Email Newsletter), No.11, December 2010.
 Panozzo, S., "Norman Hetherington: The 2009 Stanleys: The Jim Russell Award for Outstanding Contributions to Cartooning", Inkspot, No.60, (Summer 2009), pp.26–27.
 Perkins, M., "Mr Squiggle rockets in", 720 ABC Perth, 4 April 2008.
Mr Squiggle", "The Age", (Thursday, 17 May 2001), p.2.
 Samandar, L., Puppetmaster draws final masterpiece, The Daily Telegraph, Tuesday, 7 December 2010.
 Shearer, G., "Thank you Mr Squiggle for the moon", (Thursday, 9 December 2010.
 Toshack, M., "Pulling the strings in a magic world", The Sydney Morning Herald, (Wednesday, 24 November 1971, p.20.
 Tuohy, Wendy, "Mr. Squiggle: Magic on a String", The Age Green Guide, (Thursday, 24 October 1996), p.10.
 Vasek, L., "End of the line for Mr. Squiggle animator", The Australian, Tuesday, 7 December 2010.

External links 
 Mr. Squiggle's 40th Birthday
 
 National Archives of Australia: Find of the Month: Mr Squiggle copyright registration, February 2005.
Mr Squiggle at the National Film and Sound Archive

Australian children's television series
Australian Broadcasting Corporation original programming
Black-and-white Australian television shows
Australian television shows featuring puppetry
Television series about extraterrestrial life
1959 Australian television series debuts
1999 Australian television series endings
1960s Australian television series
1970s Australian television series
1980s Australian television series